Arhopala nicevillei is a butterfly in the family Lycaenidae. It was described by George Thomas Bethune-Baker in 1903. It is found in the Indomalayan  realm (Bhutan, Assam, Manipur, Burma, Thailand, and Vietnam). The specific name honours Lionel de Niceville.

References

External links
Arhopala Boisduval, 1832 at Markku Savela's Lepidoptera and Some Other Life Forms. Retrieved June 3, 2017.

Arhopala
Butterflies described in 1903